Strong Woman Gang Nam-soon is an upcoming South Korean television series starring Lee Yoo-mi in the title role, along with Kim Jung-eun, Kim Hae-sook, Ong Seong-wu, and Byeon Woo-seok. It is scheduled to premiere on JTBC in the first half of 2023.

Synopsis
Strong Woman Gang Nam-soon tells the story of Gang Nam-soon (Lee Yoo-mi) who went missing when she was a kid in Mongolia. After growing up, she travels to South Korea to find her parents where she met Gang Geun-joo (Kim Jung-eun) in Gangnam-gu, and Gil Joong-gan (Kim Hae-sook), her grandmother. Nam-soon alongside her mother and grandmother later got tangled in a drug case that is investigated by detective Gang Hee-sik (Ong Seong-wu).

Cast

Main
 Lee Yoo-mi as Gang Nam-soon
 Sixth cousin of Do Bong-soon. Like her cousin, she is born with superhuman strength whom she inherit from her mother and grandmother.
 Kim Jung-eun as Gang Geun-joo
 Mother of Gang Nam-soon who is wealthy and lives in Gangnam-gu. Like her daughter, she is born with superhuman strength.
 Kim Hae-sook as Gil Joong-gan
 Grandmother of Gang Nam-soon and mother of Gang Geun-joo. Like her daughter and granddaughter, she is born with superhuman strength.
 Ong Seong-wu as Gang Hee-sik
 A detective that specialized on investigating on drug cases in Gangnam-gu.
 Byeon Woo-seok as Ryu Shi-oh

Supporting
 Young Tak
 Kim Si-hyeon
 Joo Woo-jae
 Kim Ki-doo
 Ha Dong-joon

References

External links
 

JTBC television dramas
Korean-language television shows
Television series by JTBC Studios
2023 South Korean television series debuts

Upcoming television series